Jumaytepeque is an extinct Xincan language of Guatemala that was spoken in the region of Jumaytepeque. It was discovered by Lyle Campbell in the 1970s.

References

 Campbell, Lyle (1997). American Indian languages: The historical linguistics of Native America. New York: Oxford University Press. .+

Xincan languages
Languages attested from the 1970s
Languages extinct in the 1990s
Languages of Guatemala
Extinct languages of North America